Lina Lalandi OBE or Lina Madeleine Lalandi-Emery (born Lina Madeleine Yeleki Kaloyeropoulou on 8 June 1920 – 2012) was a Greek harpsichordist and singer known for founding and directing the English Bach Festival.

Life 
Lalandi-Emery was born in Athens in 13 July 1920, a date she tried to keep secret. Her father Nikolas Kaloyeropoulos was the director of the Byzantine Museum in Athens. She was trained at the Athens Conservatoire.

She first came to notice when she was recognised for guiding allied troops through Athens during the Second World War.

Her first marriage resulted in her having the surname Waller-Bridge. In 1962 she changed her name to Lina Madeleine Lalandi-Emery as she was in a relationship with a banker named Ralph Emery and he was already married. Ralph Emery's wife refused to grant him a divorce, but Lina enjoyed the benefits of her new partner's wealth. It is estimated that he paid two million pounds, over the years, to subsidise the English Bach Festival. The festival began in 1963 with Lalandi and Jack Westrup as joint artistic director of the English Bach Festival. The festival was originally in Oxford but in time it moved to London. It had Bach as a theme; Lalandi wrote in 1963 that the festival would also include "20th-century composers whose way of thinking is nearer to [Bach's] than to that of the Romantic age."

In 1971 Jack Westrup was no longer a joint artistic director and Lalandi held the post on her own.

In 1975 she was included in the 1975 New Year Honours. She was given an Order of the British Empire for her work with the English Bach Festival.

In 1979 she received the French Ordre des Arts et des Lettres. She also had two awards from the Greek government.

References 

Harpsichordists
Women harpsichordists
1920 births
2012 deaths
Musicians from Athens
20th-century classical musicians
Greek emigrants to the United Kingdom